Cognicide is Western Addiction's first full-length album. It was released on Fat Wreck Chords on November 1, 2005. The album is known for featuring a sound heavily inspired by Hardcore punk acts of the 1980s. Fat Mike has often listed Cognicide as one of the greatest releases on his label, Fat Wreck Chords, calling it one of the best hardcore albums he's ever heard. Joey Cape of Lagwagon has also stated that it is his favorite album released on Fat Wreck Chords.

Track listing
"Charged Words"
"Mailer, Meet Jim"
"A Poor Recipe For Civic Cohesion"
"The Church Of Black Flag"
"We Tech Supported A Manipulator"
"Incendiary Minds"
"It's Funny, I Don't Feel Like A Winner"
"When A Good Friend Attacks"
"Matrons Of The Canals"
"Face Cancer"
"Corralling Pestilence"
"Animals And Children"

Additional credits
Alex Newport – producer, engineer 
John Greenham – mastering

References

2006 debut albums
Fat Wreck Chords albums
Western Addiction albums